The 6th Empire Awards ceremony, presented by the British film magazine Empire, honored the best films of 2000 and took place on 19 February 2001. During the ceremony, Empire presented Empire Awards in nine categories as well as two honorary awards. The award for Best British Director was presented for the last time until the 10th Empire Awards where it was presented again for the last time. The ceremony was televised in the United Kingdom by Film4 on February 21 and Channel 4 on February 25. British television presenter and radio presenter Dermot O'Leary hosted the show for the first time. The awards were sponsored by Genie for the first time.

Billy Elliot and Gladiator were tied for most awards won with three awards apiece. Billy Elliot won the award for Best British Film, while Gladiator won the award for Best Film. Other winners included Snatch with two awards and X-Men with one. Aardman Animations received the Empire Inspiration Award and Richard Harris received the Lifetime Achievement Award.

Winners and nominees
Winners are listed first and highlighted in boldface.

Multiple awards
The following three films received multiple awards:

Multiple nominations
The following nine films received multiple nominations:

References

External links
 
 

Empire Award ceremonies
2000 film awards
2001 in British cinema
2001 in London
February 2001 events in the United Kingdom
2000s in the City of Westminster